Uddingston Grammar School is a mainstream state school, The school is located in Uddingston, South Lanarkshire, Scotland. It is one of 17 secondary schools operated by South Lanarkshire Council. Its motto is 'Virtute Crescam' which means 'May I grow in moral excellence'.

The school was opened in August 1884, with its buildings located next to Uddingston railway station. In 2009, Uddingston Grammar moved to a new campus nearby (on the site of its former playing fields) as part of South Lanarkshire Council's school modernisation programme; the oldest of the existing buildings was converted into apartments as part of a residential development.

The school's catchment area includes the communities of Uddingston, Bothwell, Birkenshaw, Tannochside, Viewpark and recently parts of Newton in Cambuslang.

The school's roll is approximately 1175 pupils as of September 2013, with approximately 90 teaching staff (FTE).

House groups

The school is divided into seven house groups: Arran, Bute, Lewis, Mull, Orkney, Harris and Skye, named after islands in Scotland.

Previously there were four house groups: named Clyde, Douglas, Dechmont, and Calder after Scottish rivers.

Notable former pupils
 Stuart Carswell, football player
 Colin Cameron, politician
 John Kirk, cricketer
 Robert MacFarlane, cricketer and cricket administrator
 Gary MacKenzie, football player
 Aileen McGlynn, Paralympic athlete
 Alexander McNab, cricketer
 Craig Moore, football player
 Iain Munro, former football player and manager
 Dr Gregor Smith, Chief Medical Officer for Scotland
 Thomas Watson, cricketer

References

1884 establishments in Scotland
Bothwell and Uddingston
Educational institutions established in 1884
Secondary schools in South Lanarkshire
School buildings completed in 2009